10 Items or Less is a 2006 American comedy-drama film written and directed by Brad Silberling and starring Morgan Freeman and Paz Vega. Shot in fifteen days, 10 Items or Less made its release as a digital download – the first such release via the Internet – while it was still in theaters.

ClickStar, founded by Morgan Freeman and Lori McCreary, made the film available digitally on December 15, 2006, fourteen days after its theatrical debut. This event was highlighted by the American Film Institute in their AFI Awards 2006 "Moments of Significance".

Plot
Through circumstance, two strangers—an actor preparing for an upcoming role and a cashier—drive around Los Angeles together, having a number of conversations about life and exploring the differences and similarities between their worlds.

Cast
 Morgan Freeman as himself
 Paz Vega as Scarlet 
 Kumar Pallana as Lee
 Jonah Hill as Packy
 Anne Dudek as Lorraine
 Bobby Cannavale as Bobby
 Jim Parsons as Receptionist at Construction Company

Production
Revelation Entertainment produced the film, and Morgan Freeman served as executive producer. The film was shot in fifteen days,  entirely in Carson and Brentwood.

Reception

Box office
The film was released in only fifteen theaters, taking in $35,929 in its first weekend. The total domestic box-office take was $83,291. The film was more successful internationally, grossing $1,315,931 at the international box office, with $486,895 grossed in Vega's home country of Spain.

Critical response
Jonathan Rosenbaum of the Chicago Reader, called the film "A friendly demonstration of how two actors with charisma and a relaxed writer-director (Brad Silberling) can make a nice movie for practically nothing." In contrast, Desson Thomson of The Washington Postwrote the film is "a good-natured but failed experiment in meeting cute -- indie-movie style". Robert Koehler of Variety wrote: "
Interplay between a jaunty Freeman as an unemployed movie star and the magnetic Paz Vega as a no-nonsense grocery store checker gives pic humanity and lift."

Critical reaction to the film was mixed, with general praise for the work of the two main actors. On Rotten Tomatoes, the film had a 63% approval rating based on 60 reviews, with an average rating of 6.2/10. The critics consensus reads: "A small film that relies too heavily on the charm of big actors." On Metacritic it has a score of 54% based on reviews from 20 critics.

Accolades
The film was named one of the "Top Independent Films of 2006" by the National Board of Review.

Home media
The DVD was released in the U.S. on April 24, 2007. It includes audio commentary by Silberling, a featurette on 'the making of', and 6 deleted scenes.

Soundtrack
Although a soundtrack was not officially released, the following songs were included in the film:
 
 "Rose" – Martin Blasick
 "Latin Thugs" – Cypress Hill
 "Las Isabeles" – Mariachi Sol de Mexico
 "Cancion Villista" – Ixya Herrera and Xocoyotzin Herrera
 "Colorin Colorao" – Jesus Alejandro "El Niño"
 "Las Perlitas" – Mariachi Aguila Real
 "Con Tu Amor Y Pasion" – Sergio Cardenas
 "I've Got The World On A String" – Martin Blasick
 "La Receta" – Kemo the Blaxican  (song at car wash)
 "It's Me Jody" – Herbert Stothart
 "En Este Varrio" – Delinquent Habits featuring Ozomatli
 "Al Pasar la Barca" – Paz Vega and Morgan Freeman
 "Duncan" – Paul Simon
 "Let The Horn Blow" – Delinquent Habits

See also
 List of American films of 2006

References

External links
 
 

2006 films
2006 independent films
2006 comedy-drama films
American comedy-drama films
2000s English-language films
Films directed by Brad Silberling
Films with screenplays by Brad Silberling
Films set in Los Angeles
Films about actors
Films scored by Antônio Pinto
2000s American films
English-language comedy-drama films